The John A. Blatnik Bridge is the bridge that carries Interstate 535 (I-535) and U.S. Highway 53 (US 53) over the Saint Louis River, a tributary of Lake Superior, between Duluth, Minnesota, and Superior, Wisconsin. It was dedicated on December 2, 1961, but was renamed for Congressman John Blatnik on September 24, 1971, to commemorate Blatnik's role in making the bridge a reality. The Blatnik Bridge replaced a swinging toll bridge around the same location that carried both automobile and rail traffic.

The bridge was widened and the substructure was strengthened between 1992 and 1993 to accommodate hard shoulders.  The Blatnik Bridge was reduced to two lanes temporarily in 2008, after it was discovered in a bridge inspection that the 1990s upgrades to the Blatnik Bridge had added weight beyond the load limit for gusset plates in eight different locations.  This was similar to the gusset plates that caused the I-35W Bridge in Minneapolis to collapse on August 1, 2007.  The Blatnik Bridge was reduced to two lanes temporarily until the gusset plates could be strengthened.

In November 2011, both the  Minnesota and Wisconsin departments of transportation installed new signs to remind drivers that trucks over  gross vehicle weight cannot use the Blatnik Bridge; these vehicles will be rerouted to the nearby Bong Bridge. According to the press release, permitted, overweight vehicles have been restricted from using the Blatnik Bridge since early 2008 when inspections showed that corrosion and time were starting to affect the structure. Transportation officials say that the bridge is aging and restriction of overweight vehicles will help to extend the life of the bridge. Drivers who disregard the posted weight limits will be ticketed.

Almost 34,000 vehicles cross the road daily in 2017. Further detioriation of the bridge resulted in yearly inspections, rather than every two years by 2021. Major repair work was required every 4 years to keep the bridge open. President Joe Biden visited the bridge in 2022 as part of a tour to boost the infrastructure bill signed the previous year. The cost to replace the bridge is roughly estimated to cost $1.8 billion with construction beginning as soon as 2026. Construction would last 5-6 years. The bridge currently empties to Hammond Ave in Superior but proposals for replacement would connect the bridge directly to US 53. The Blatnik bridge would remain operation during construction with the new bridge built to the north or south of the existing bridge.

The Blatnik Bridge is one of two connecting Duluth and Superior, the other being the Richard I. Bong Memorial Bridge, a tied-arch bridge upriver from the Blatnik Bridge. The Bong Bridge carries U.S. Highway 2 (US 2) over the St. Louis Bay.

President Joe Biden cited the bridge several times during his visit to Superior in March 2022 to tout his infrastructure plan, describing it as a "critical benefit" of the infrastructure law.

Accident 
On July 22, 2022, a 55-year-old man died after striking construction equipment on the Duluth-bound section of the bridge with his SUV at around 7:50 PM.

See also

References

External links 

Road bridges in Minnesota
Through arch bridges in the United States
U.S. Route 53
Bridges completed in 1961
Bridges on the Interstate Highway System
Lake Superior Circle Tour
Buildings and structures in Duluth, Minnesota
Transportation in Duluth, Minnesota
Buildings and structures in Douglas County, Wisconsin
Road bridges in Wisconsin
Bridges of the United States Numbered Highway System
Former toll bridges in Minnesota
Former toll bridges in Wisconsin
Superior, Wisconsin
Interstate 35
1961 establishments in Minnesota
1961 establishments in Wisconsin